This is a list of the main career statistics of professional tennis player Ivan Lendl.

Grand Slam finals

Singles: 19 finals (8 titles, 11 runners-up)

Grand Prix year-end championships finals

Singles: 9 finals (5 titles, 4 runners-up)
Note: Lendl formerly held the record for the most final appearances at 9, until Federer broke it with his 10th final appearance in 2015. Roger Federer broke a tie with Lendl and Pete Sampras by claiming his sixth year-ending championship on November 27, 2011.

WCT year-end championships finals

Singles: 3 finals (2 titles, 1 runner-up)

Grand Prix Super Series / ATP Super 9 finals

Singles: 33  (22 titles, 11 runner-ups)

Singles performance timeline

Tournaments statistics

ATP win–loss includes WCT tournaments which were run outside Volvo Grand Prix and ATP Computer Ranking system during 1982-1984, also includes team events (Davis Cup, World Team Cup in Düsseldorf).

Career finals

Singles titles (94)

Runners-ups (52)

Other (non-ATP, invitational & special events) singles finals
Here are Lendl's tournament finals that are not included in the statistics on the Association of Tennis Professionals website. It includes non-ATP tournaments such as special, invitational and exhibition events.

Other singles titles - Draw at least 8 players (38)

Other singles titles - Draw less than 8 players (19)
Below are Lendl's winnings on exhibition tournaments (usually 4-men's draw)

Career doubles finals listed by ATP (16)

Doubles titles (6) 
1979 (1): Berlin (CL) / (w/Kirmayr)
1980 (1): Barcelona (CL) / (w/Denton)
1984 (1): Wembley (IC) / (w/Gomez)
1985 (1): Stuttgart Outdoor (CL) / (w/Smid)
1986 (1): Fort Myers (H) / (w/Gomez)
1987 (1): Adelaide (G) / (w/Scanlon)

Doubles runners-up (10) 
1979 (1): Florence (CL) / (w/Slozil)
1980 (2): Indianapolis (CL) / (w/Fibak), Cincinnati (H) / (w/Fibak)
1983 (1): San Francisco (IC) / (w/Van Patten)
1986 (1): Tokyo Indoor (IC) / (w/Gomez)
1988 (1): Monte Carlo (CL) / (w/Leconte)
1990 (1): Queen's Club (G) / (w/Leconte)
1990 (1): Sydney Indoor (IH) / (w/Edberg)
1992 (1): Barcelona (CL) / (w/Novacek)
1993 (1): Marseille (IC) / (w/Van Rensburg)

click on the year link expands all Lendl's doubles matches for the respective year listed on ATP website

Record against top players

Career prize money statistics

Top 10 wins

References

Lendl, Ivan